Rizvan Vakhayevich Tashayev (born 5 October 2003) is a Russian football player who plays for FC Akhmat Grozny.

Club career
He made his debut in the Russian Premier League for FC Akhmat Grozny on 27 August 2022 in a game against PFC Krylia Sovetov Samara.

Career statistics

References

External links
 
 
 
 

2003 births
Sportspeople from Grozny
Living people
Russian footballers
Association football goalkeepers
FC Akhmat Grozny players
Russian Premier League players